Robert Beale may refer to:

 Robert Beale (diplomat) (1541–1601), Clerk of the Privy Council and antiquary
 Robert Beale, Sergeant-at-Arms of the United States Senate
 Bobby Beale (1884–1950), English football player